Sabri bin Sahar (born 1 September 1992) is a Malaysian professional footballer who plays as a midfielder for Malaysia Premier League club Sarawak United, on loan from Sabah.

References

1992 births
Living people
Malaysian footballers
People from Sabah
Sabah F.C. (Malaysia) players
Negeri Sembilan FA players
Sarawak FA players
Sarawak United FC players
Association football midfielders